Pyrrhia is a genus of moths of the family Noctuidae.

Species
 Pyrrhia bifaciata (Staudinger, 1888)
 Pyrrhia cilisca (Guenée, 1852)
 Pyrrhia exprimens (Walker, 1857)
 Pyrrhia hedemanni (Staudinger, 1892)
 Pyrrhia purpurina (Esper, 1804)
 Pyrrhia treitschkei (Frivaldszky, 1835)
 Pyrrhia umbra (Hufnagel, 1766)
 Pyrrhia victorina (Sodoffsky, 1849)

References
Natural History Museum Lepidoptera genus database
Pyrrhia at funet

Heliothinae